The Professional 3 is the third studio album by American record producer DJ Clue. It was released on December 19, 2006 via Roc-A-Fella Records, serving as a sequel to his 2001 The Professional 2.

Production was handled by Ken "Duro" Ifill, DVLP, Baby Paul, CHOPS, Filthy, Kanye West, L.T. Hutton, Shatek King, Swizz Beatz. The Heatmakerz and Clue himself.

It features guest appearances by Fabolous, Juelz Santana, Mario Winans, The Game, Beanie Sigel, Bun B, Cam'ron, Cassidy, Consequence, Fat Joe, Freeway, Jadakiss, Jagged Edge, Kanye West, Lil Wayne, Mike Jones, Mobb Deep, M.O.P., Nas, Paul Wall, Ransom, Remy Ma, Rick Ross, Snoop Dogg, Styles P and Young Jeezy.

The album peaked at number seventy-three on the Billboard 200 chart, and number eighteen on the Top R&B/Hip-Hop Albums chart.

Track listing 
 "War" - (featuring Nas) 1:57
 "Clear Da Scene" - (featuring Rick Ross, Lil Wayne and Ransom) (produced by DVLP and Filthy) 3:53
 "Fuck Off" - (featuring Young Jeezy and Juelz Santana) (produced by DVLP) 2:47
 "The Gold" - (featuring Mobb Deep) 4:26
 "I Really Wanna Know You" - (featuring Jagged Edge and Fabolous) (produced by DURO) 6:12
 "A Week Ago (Part 1)" - (featuring Mario Winans and The Game) 4:15
 "Like This" - (featuring Fabolous and Kanye West) (produced by Kanye West) 5:28
 "Almost Fucked" - (featuring Snoop Dogg) (produced by L.T. Hutton) 2:47
 "Grill and Woman" - (featuring Mike Jones, Paul Wall and Bun B) (produced by CHOPS) 4:33
 "Liberty Bell" - (featuring Beanie Sigel, Cassidy and Freeway) 2:48
 "Da Boss" - (featuring Fabolous) (produced by Shatek King) 3:12
 "The Animal" - (featuring Styles P) 3:18
 "Middle Finger U" - (featuring Cam'ron and Juelz Santana) 3:44
 "Giantz of NYC" - (featuring M.O.P.) (produced by The Heatmakerz) 4:19
 "You Don't Really Wanna" - (featuring Fat Joe and Remy Ma) (produced by Baby Paul) 3:22
 "Ugly (Thug It Out)" - (featuring Jadakiss and Swizz Beatz) (produced by Swizz Beatz) 4:00
 "A Week Ago (Part 2)" - (featuring Mario Winans and The Game) 4:16
 "Uptown" - (featuring Consequence) 3:43

Charts

Weekly charts

Year-end charts

References

External links

2006 albums
Sequel albums
DJ Clue? albums
Def Jam Recordings albums
Roc-A-Fella Records albums
Albums produced by DJ Clue?
Albums produced by Kanye West
Albums produced by L.T. Hutton
Albums produced by Swizz Beatz
Albums produced by the Heatmakerz